Pao-Kuan Wang (born 1949) is a Taiwanese atmospheric scientist.

Wang studied meteorology at National Taiwan University, then pursued advanced degrees in atmospheric science at University of California, Los Angeles, culminating in a doctorate completed in 1978. He taught at the University of Wisconsin–Madison starting in 1980, and was granted emeritus status in 2016. He is a fellow of the American Meteorological Society and the Meteorological Society of the Republic of China, which he was elected to in 2005 and 2008 respectively. He was president of the latter organization from 2013 to 2017. In 2018, Wang was elected an academician of Academia Sinica. Wang has written several popular science books in Chinese.

References

Living people
1949 births
Taiwanese atmospheric scientists
Taiwanese expatriates in the United States
Fellows of the American Meteorological Society
Members of Academia Sinica
National Taiwan University alumni
University of California, Los Angeles alumni
University of Wisconsin–Madison faculty